"Blame" is a song by Scottish DJ and record producer Calvin Harris from his fourth studio album, Motion (2014). It was released as the album's third single on 5 September 2014. The song features the vocals of English singer John Newman and is included on the deluxe edition of Newman's second studio album, Revolve. Newman's brother James Newman assisted the artists in writing the song, with Harris serving as the producer.

The song received positive reviews from music critics, who complimented its production and Newman's vocals. The song debuted at number one on the UK Singles Chart, giving Harris his seventh UK number-one single (and third consecutive) and Newman his third.

Background
John Newman initially approached Calvin Harris via Twitter about collaborating on a song he had worked on. Newman sent a demo with his vocals and a few chords and Harris built the music around it. Newman wrote all the lyrics.

The single and its artwork were announced on Twitter on 8 June 2014. However, a different artwork cover was uploaded onto the iTunes Store as a replacement. "Blame" was originally scheduled for release on 25 August, but was delayed until 7 September.

In August and September 2014, Harris released fifteen-second previews of the track on his Instagram account. John Newman commented on the song: "It will live up to the hype that's been built. I'm very excited about it, I think it's the next step up in my career." The song is written in the key of C minor, at a tempo of 128 beats per minute. Newman's vocal range spans from B3 to  B5.

Critical reception
The song received positive reviews from music critics. Robbie Daw of Idolator praised the song saying: "'Blame' somehow feels fuller and more rounded-out, structurally, than much of [Harris'] other output. Call it a new era for the Scottish producer/DJ." MTV Australia described the song as "hot" and "sure to have the crowd singing loud and proud". Digital Spy's Lewis Corner gave the song a four star rating out of five, commenting: "Luckily for Calvin, everything he touches these days seems to turn more golden than his glowing tan. Guest vocalist John Newman soulfully insists on the surging bridge, before it bursts into one of Calvin's infectious four-to-the-floor choruses. It barely shifts away from the formula that's enabled him to achieve 1 billion Spotify streams, but when it's proving itself that effective, why resign the Midas Touch?"

We Got This Covered gave a positive review, noting that it was "a bit slower and more down tempo than most of his usual stuff" and said "John Newman's soulful vocals go down smoothly as they layer a very catchy melody that soon breaks out into a full-on dance floor hit. Admittedly, it doesn't grab you quite like Summer did, but it's still a great song and one that will surely do very well." Music and Lyrics gave a more nuanced review, writing the song "hasn't honestly hit as hard as 'Summer' did on the first listen, but I'll definitely label it as a 'grower'. Not really feeling John's verses, but he really shines in the let's-go-to-church hook. 'Blame' doesn't have the best Calvin Harris EDM beat I've heard to date, but I can still bop to it."

Commercial performance
"Blame" entered the UK Singles Chart at number one with 70,312 copies sold in its first week, becoming Harris's seventh UK number one and Newman's third. In the United States, the song debuted at number thirty-one on the Billboard Hot 100 chart dated 27 September 2014, peaking at number nineteen on 15 November 2014. The single topped the charts in Finland, the Netherlands, Norway and Sweden, while charting within the top five in Austria, Germany, Ireland and Italy, and the top ten in Australia, Denmark, France, New Zealand and Spain.

Music video
The music video was directed by Emil Nava and released on 12 September 2014. It was filmed in Los Angeles and London in August 2014. The video begins with both Harris and Newman in separate places in their appropriate houses where they are both on the bed. Newman is watching some models who are seen on a film projector. Meanwhile, the models decided to go to a nightclub where one girl gets drunk while other models split where they fall into a sink, beer cooler, puddle and finally a tub. The video ends with the models ending up in a river where they are freezing and it shows the sky with the sun in the background.

Track listings

 Released on 25 September 2015. First release of "Remixes" in lossless format. Includes the "Extended Version" of "Blame" in addition to the previously released songs found on the original "Remixes" release.

Personnel
Credits adapted from the liner notes of Motion.

 Calvin Harris – all instruments, arrangement, mixing, production
 John Newman – vocals
 Seb Berrios – additional vocal engineering
 Simon Davey – mastering
 Arthur Indrikovs – vocal engineering

Charts

Weekly charts

Year-end charts

Decade-end charts

Certifications

Release history

References

External links
 
 Full Lyrics of "Blame" at DirectLyrics

2014 singles
2014 songs
Calvin Harris songs
Columbia Records singles
Dutch Top 40 number-one singles
John Newman (singer) songs
Number-one singles in Finland
Number-one singles in Norway
Number-one singles in Scotland
Number-one singles in Sweden
UK Singles Chart number-one singles
Songs written by John Newman (singer)
Songs written by Calvin Harris
Songs written by James Newman (musician)
Songs about infidelity